Edwin James Benson (Ma-doke-wa-des-she, modern Mandan orthography: Wéroke Wáatashe, Iron Bison) was a Native American educator and the last native speaker of the Mandan language. He was born in Elbowoods, North Dakota, on the Fort Berthold Reservation in McLean County, North Dakota. When the Garrison Dam was built, Benson and his family were relocated to Twin Buttes, North Dakota. He taught Mandan at Twin Buttes Elementary School, and was awarded an honorary doctorate from the University of North Dakota in 2009. He was involved in efforts to teach the basics of Mandan to youth. When he died on December 9, 2016, the Mandan language became extinct.

The documentary To Save a Language (2020) showed the efforts of a linguist who tried to learn and save the Mandan language.

References 

1931 births
2016 deaths
20th-century Native Americans
Schoolteachers from North Dakota
Language teachers
Last known speakers of a Native American language
Native American history of North Dakota
Native American language revitalization
People from McLean County, North Dakota
Mandan people
21st-century Native Americans